London Road railway station can refer to:

Bicester London Road railway station (now called Bicester Village railway station)
Braunston London Road railway station
London Road (Brighton) railway station
Carlisle London Road railway station (disused)
London Road (Guildford) railway station
Leicester London Road railway station (now called Leicester railway station)
Manchester London Road railway station (now called Manchester Piccadilly station)
Nottingham London Road railway station (disused)
St Albans (London Road) railway station (disused)
London Road (Cairnryan Military Railway) railway station (disused) on the Cairnryan Military Railway
Wellingborough London Road railway station